Minuscule 314 (in the Gregory-Aland numbering), O11 (Soden), is a Greek minuscule manuscript of the New Testament, on parchment. Palaeographically it has been assigned to the 11th century. 
Formerly it was labelled by 23a, 28p, and 6r.

Description 

The codex contains the text of the Acts of the Apostles, Catholic epistles, Pauline epistles, and Book of Revelation on 299 parchment leaves with numerous lacunae. The text is written in one column per page, biblical text in 22 lines per page, text of commentary in 57-66 lines per page.
According to Scrivener it is "a beautiful little book".

 Lacunae
Acts 1:1-3:10; 3:10-11:13; 14:9-26; 17:6-19; 20:28-24:12 1 Peter 2:2-16; 3:7-21; 2 Corinthians 9:14-11:9; Gal 1:1-18; Ephesians 6:1-19; Philippians 4:7-23; Rev 1:10-17; 9:11-17; 17:10-18:8; 20:1-22:21.

Acts 1:1-3:10 was supplied in the 14th century.

Text 

The Greek text of the codex is a representative of the Byzantine text-type. Aland placed it in Category V.

History 

The manuscript was written in Ephesus. It was examined by Richard Bentley (χ'), John Mill (Baroc.), Caspar, Johann Jakob Wettstein, Johann Jakob Griesbach (only 1 Cor. 15), and Bloomfield. C. R. Gregory saw it in 1883. Formerly it was labelled by 23a, 28p, and 6r. In 1908 Gregory gave number 314 for it.

A full Commentary on the Apocalypse, was edited by J. A. Cramer in 1840.

The manuscript is currently housed at the Bodleian Library (MS. Barocci 3) at Oxford.

See also 

 List of New Testament minuscules
 Biblical manuscript
 Textual criticism

References

Further reading

External links 
 MS Barocci 3. Images available on Digital Bodleian
 MS Barocci 3 Bodleian catalogue record
 R. Waltz, Minuscule 314 at the Encyclopedia of Textual Criticism

Greek New Testament minuscules
11th-century biblical manuscripts
Bodleian Library collection